Ibraima Fali Baldé (born 15 January 1986 in Bissau) is a Guinea-Bissauan footballer who plays as a striker.

External links
 
 
 
 

1986 births
Living people
Sportspeople from Bissau
Bissau-Guinean footballers
Association football forwards
Primeira Liga players
Liga Portugal 2 players
Segunda Divisão players
C.F. Estrela da Amadora players
G.D. Tourizense players
S.C.U. Torreense players
Odivelas F.C. players
S.C. Beira-Mar players
F.C. Vizela players
Clube Oriental de Lisboa players
Liga I players
Liga II players
FC Politehnica Iași (1945) players
Guinea-Bissau international footballers
Bissau-Guinean expatriate footballers
Expatriate footballers in Portugal
Expatriate footballers in Romania
Bissau-Guinean expatriate sportspeople in Portugal
Bissau-Guinean expatriate sportspeople in Romania